Atirus Shopping Center, opened on December 17, 2005, is a modern shopping mall located in the suburban district of Büyükçekmece in Istanbul, Turkey. It is named after the location, which was called Atirus in the ancient times.

Constructed by Kapıcıoğlu Company, the earthquake-proof building cost 54 million (approx. $40 million as of 2005). It is situated on the busy highway D.100, which runs from Istanbul westwards through Büyükçekmece. There is also place for 63 offices. The parking lot has a capacity of 700 cars. Around 1,000 service people are employed in the property.

84 independent units of the shopping mall are owned by Kapıcıoğlu Co. while 66 units belong to the Büyükçekmece Municipality.

References

Shopping malls in Turkey